Jakub a Terezka is a Czech adventure game by JRC Interactive and Česká spořitelna.

Production
The game was built using the CPAL engine. Created for the Stop Drugs campaign, it is a humanitarian project, and was given away free. Jan Hloušek served as the game's chief programmer while Jan Zemanek did the graphic design.

The characters of Jakub and Terezka have had a life beyond this original game; for example an app was designed that saw the duo overcome the puzzles and riddles that the Sorcerer Matthew has prepared for them.

Plot and gameplay
The game centres around a young man named Jakub who discovers his girlfriend is addicted to heroin. His job is to convince her to begin treatment using lawful methods.

Critical reception
Bonusweb.cz decided it was wrong to give the game a numerical rating as despite it being technically poor and short, as a humanitarian project it had intrinsic value.

References

1999 video games
Point-and-click adventure games
Video games developed in the Czech Republic
Windows games
Windows-only games
JRC Interactive games